Mali Izvor may refer to:

 Mali izvor, a village in Tervel Municipality, Dobrich Province, Bulgaria
 Mali Izvor (Boljevac), a village in the municipality of Boljevac, Zaječar District, Serbia
 Mali Izvor (Zaječar), a village in the municipality of Zaječar, Zaječar District, Serbia